Parayan Baaki Vechathu is a 2014 Indian Malayalam political thriller film directed by Karim  and starring Maqbool Salmaan, Anumol and Devika.

Cast
 Maqbool Salmaan as Emmanuel
 Anumol
 Swasika
 Devika Nambiar
 Madhu
 Siddique
 Sai Kumar
 Irshad
 Balachandran Chullikkadu
 Mamukkoya
 Sathaar
 Zeenath
 Bindu Panicker
 Ambika Mohan
 Jayakrishnan
 Gopika Anil

Production
It was Abbas's long-time dream to produce a film by Bharathan. This never happened and he is now back to the industry after three decades to produce a film which is directed by Bharathan's disciple Karim. Karim has previously directed movies titled "Ezharakkoottam", "Samoohyapaadam" and "Agni Nakshatram". 

Mallika was initially cast as Maqbool's heroine but when she opted out, Anumol, who earlier acted in the internationally acclaimed feature Akam, was chosen for the role. Another important role is played by debutante actress Devika.

References

External links

2014 films
2010s Malayalam-language films
Indian political thriller films